Praseodymium(III) iodide is an inorganic salt, consisting of the rare-earth metal praseodymium with hydrogen iodide with the chemical formula PrI3, with green crystals. It is soluble in water.

Preparation 
 Heating praseodymium and iodine in an inert atmosphere produces praseodymium(III) iodide:

 

 It can also be obtained by heating praseodymium with mercury(II) iodide:

Physical properties 
Praseodymium(III) iodide forms green crystals, which are soluble in water.

Praseodymium(III) iodide forms orthorhombic crystals which are hygroscopic. It crystallizes in the PuBr3 type with space group Cmcm (No. 63) with a = 4.3281(6) Å, b = 14.003(6) Å and c = 9.988(3) Å.

Other compounds 
PrI3 forms compounds with hydrazine, like I3Pr·3N2H4·4H2O which has pale yellow crystals and soluble in methanol, slightly soluble in water, and insoluble in benzene, d20 ℃ = 2.986 g/cm3.

PrI3 forms compounds with urea, like I3Pr·5CO(NH2)2 which has pale green crystals.

PrI3 forms compounds with thiourea, like I3Pr·2CS(NH2)2·9H2O which is a green crystal with d = 2.27 g/cm3.

Praseodymium(III) iodide forms a nonahydrate, PrI3·9H2O. It can be obtained by dissolving praseodymium(III) oxide in concentrated aqueous hydroiodic acid:

Pr2O3 + 6 HI + 15H2O → 2 PrI3·9H2O

It adopts the same structure as other light rare earth iodides (La–Ho) and contains a triangular tricapped prismatic nonaaqua ion [Pr(OH2)9]3+ and iodide counterions.

Praseodymium(III) iodide reacts with praseodymium metal at elevated temperatures to form praseodymium diiodide:

2 PrI3 + Pr → 3 PrI2

References 

Iodides
Lanthanide halides